Verticordia mirabilis is a flowering plant in the myrtle family, Myrtaceae and is endemic to a small area in the Gibson Desert. It is a bushy, spreading shrub with its leaves mostly crowded on short side branches and with large, deep red flowers in small groups in spring.

Description

The sepals also have two hairy, ear-like appendages which bend over the hypanthium. Flowering time is mainly during September and October.

Taxonomy and naming
Verticordia mirabilis was first formally described by Elizabeth and Alex George in 2001 from specimen collected near Warburton and the description was published in Nuytsia. The specific epithet (mirabilis) is derived from a Latin word meaning "wonderful" or "strange" referring to "the wonder and astonishment of discovering a species of Verticordia so far beyond the previously known occurrence of the genus, in a desert habitat."

This species was placed in subgenus Eperephes, section Integripetala along with helmsii, V. rennieana, V. interioris, and V. picta.

Distribution and habitat
This verticordia is only found in lateritic soil on a rocky breakaway south of Warburton, growing with Verticordia jamiesonii in the Gibson Desert biogeographic region.

Conservation
Verticordia mirabilis  is classified as  "Priority One" by the Western Australian Government Department of Parks and Wildlife meaning that it is known from only one or a few locations which are potentially at risk.

Use in horticulture
This recently discovered species has been propagated from cuttings and grown in pots to flowering stage but its horticultural requirements are not yet well understood.

References

mirabilis
Rosids of Western Australia
Eudicots of Western Australia
Plants described in 1864